The Montreal Baroque Orchestra is an early music ensemble based in Montreal, Quebec, Canada. It was established in 1989 by conductor Joël Thiffault.

Discography
 Francesco Geminiani - Concertos grossos (1997) Harmonia Mundi - International distributor 
 Handel - Ouvertures (1999)
 Naturally Handel (2008)
 Marin Marais - Semele Overture er danses - Montréal Baroque - ATM Baroque (2006)

References

External links
 MBO 2002-3
 ATMA - Artist information

Early music groups
Canadian orchestras
Early music orchestras
Musical groups established in 1989
Musical groups from Montreal